Cala Bassa is a beach the north western seaboard of the Spanish island of Ibiza.

Gallery

References

Beaches of Ibiza
Beaches of the Balearic Islands